The Orionids meteor shower, often shortened to the Orionids, is the most prolific meteor shower associated with Halley's Comet. The Orionids are so-called because the point they appear to come from, called the radiant, lies in the constellation Orion, but they can be seen over a large area of the sky. The Orionids are an annual meteor shower which last approximately one week in late October. In some years, meteors may occur at rates of 50–70 per hour.

History
Meteor showers first designated "shooting stars" were connected to comets in the 1800s. E.C. Herrick made an observation in 1839 and 1840 about the activity present in the October night skies. A. S. Herschel produced the first documented record that gave accurate forecasts for the next meteor shower. The Orionids meteor shower is produced by Halley's Comet, which was named after the astronomer Edmund Halley and last passed through the inner Solar System in 1986 on its 75- to 76-year orbit. When the comet passes through the Solar System, the Sun sublimates some of the ice, allowing rock particles to break away from the comet. These particles continue on the comet's trajectory and appear as meteors ("falling stars") when they pass through Earth's upper atmosphere. Halley's comet is also responsible for creating the Eta Aquariids, which occur each May.

* This meteor shower may give double peaks as well as plateaus, and time periods of flat maxima lasting several days.

Meteor shower and location

The radiant of the Orionids is located between the constellations Orion and Gemini (in the southeastern sky before dawn, as viewed from mid-northern latitudes. Observers observing the small meteor "Halleyids" at the Marshall Space Flight Center in Alabama saw streaks radiating in all directions with the naked eye.

Gallery

See also
 List of meteor showers

References

External links
 Worldwide viewing times for the 2016 Orionids meteor shower
 Orionids Peak This Weekend (Carl Hergenrother : 2012 Oct 20)
 Orionids 2012: visual data quicklook (International Meteor Organization)
 Spaceweather.com: 2009 Orionid Meteor Shower photo gallery: Page 1
 realclearwx.com: 2009 Orionid Meteor Shower Photos and Video
 Orionids at Constellation Guide

Halley's Comet
Meteor showers
October events
November events